John Holman may refer to:

John Holman (slave trader) (17??-1791), English slave trader
John Holman (politician) (1872–1925), Australian politician
John Holman (NASCAR owner) (1918–1975), former championship co-owner on the NASCAR circuit of Holman Moody team
John R. Holman (1950–2017), philatelist
John Holman (writer) (born 1951), American short story writer, novelist, and academic
Sir John Holman, 1st Baronet (c. 1633–1700), MP for Banbury
John Holman (chemist), British chemist
John Holman (athlete), British high jumper and competitor in athletics at the 1990 Commonwealth Games – Men's high jump